The Karcham Wangtoo Hydroelectric Plant is a  run-of-the-river hydroelectric power station on the Sutlej River in Kinnaur district of Himachal Pradesh state of India.

Etymology

The dam and power station are located between the villages of Karcham and Wangtoo where the plant also gains its name.

History

In 1993, and after years of delays, the Jaypee Karcham Hydro Corporation Limited of Jaypee Group signed a memorandum of understanding to develop the dam. On 18 November 2005, the construction on the power station began. In 2015, Jaypee Group sold out Karcham Wangtoo Project to JSW Group.

In May 2011, the first generator was commissioned, the second in June and the final two in September.

Technical details 

Water not diverted by the dam is sent over the spillway and down the normal course of the river. The main spillway is along the crest of the dam and is controlled by six radial gates. 

Just upstream of the dam is the 300 MW Baspa II Hydroelectric Plant and downstream of the Karcham Wangtoo is the 1,500 MW Nathpa Jhakri Dam.

Transport

In 2020, construction of a new nearly 150 km long "Karcham-Harsil Road" was announced. It will link Karcham on NH-5 to Harsil on NH-34, both in Himachal Pradesh. This new road, to be constructed by Border Roads Organisation (BRO) at a cost between Rs 2,500 to Rs 3,000 crore, is in addition to the 73 previously approved India-China Border Roads (ICBR). It will cut down present 450 km long distance, which take nearly 16 hours, to just nearly 150 km or 2 to 3 hours. Since Karcham and Harsial are 26 km and 52 km away from the Line of Actual Control (LAC) respectively, the new road will also enable the faster deployment of troop.

See also

 Nathpa Jhakri Dam – situated downstream
 Indus Water Treaty - includes Sutlej river

References

Dams completed in 2011
Energy infrastructure completed in 2011
Dams in Himachal Pradesh
Dams on the Sutlej River
Run-of-the-river power stations
Gravity dams
Buildings and structures in Kinnaur district
2011 establishments in Himachal Pradesh